Cylindrostomidae is a family of flatworms belonging to the order Prolecithophora.

Genera:
 Allostoma van Beneden, 1861
 Allostoma Westblad, 1955
 Cylindrostoma Örsted, 1845
 Einarhelmins Karling, 1993
 Enterostomula Reisinger, 1926
 Euxinia Graff, 1911
 Monoophorum Böhmig, 1890
 Pregermarium Stirewalt, Ferguson & Kepner, 1942
 Thallagus Marcus, 1951

References

Platyhelminthes